Coralliophila norfolk is a species of sea snail, a marine gastropod mollusc in the family Muricidae, the murex snails or rock snails.

Description

Distribution
This marine species was found on the Norfolk Ridge, New Caledonia.

References

Gastropods described in 2008
Coralliophila